The following is an episode list for the comedy-drama Reaper. The program premiered on September 25, 2007, in the United States on The CW.

Series overview

Episodes

Season 1 (2007–2008)

Season 2 (2009)

References

Lists of American fantasy television series episodes
Lists of American comedy-drama television series episodes